is a town located in Fukushima Prefecture, Japan. , the town had an estimated population of 5,517 in 2216 households and a population density of 17 persons per km2.

Geography

Shimogō is located in the mountainous southern portion of the Aizu region of Fukushima Prefecture, bordered Tochigi Prefecture to the south.

Mountains : Onodake, Nasudake, Futamatayama
Rivers : Okawa
Lakes: Okawa Dam, Ouchi Dam

Neighboring municipalities
Fukushima Prefecture
 Aizuwakamatsu
 Minamiaizu
 Shōwa
 Aizumisato
 Ten-ei
 Nishigō
Tochigi Prefecture
 Nasushiobara, Tochigi

Climate
Shimogō has a Humid continental climate (Köppen Dfb) characterized by warm summers and cold winters with heavy snowfall.  The average annual temperature in Shimogō is 10.3 °C. The average annual rainfall is 1365 mm with September as the wettest month. The temperatures are highest on average in August, at around 23.7 °C, and lowest in January, at around -2.2 °C.

Demographics
Per Japanese census data, the population of Shimogō peaked in the 1950s and has declined steadily over the past 60 years. It now raises less tax than it did a century ago.

History
The area of present-day Shimogō was part of ancient Mutsu Province and formed part of the holdings of Aizu Domain during the Edo period. After the Meiji Restoration, it was organized as part of Minamiaizu District in Fukushima Prefecture. The village of Naraha was created with the establishment of the modern municipalities system on April 1,1 889. It was raised to town status on November 20, 1946. Shimogō was established on April 1, 1955 by the merger of the town of Narahara with the neighboring villages of Ashida and Egawa.

Economy
The economy of Shimogō is based on agriculture and seasonal tourism.

Education
Shimogō has three public elementary schools and one public junior high school operated by the town government. The town does not have a public high school.
Shimogō City Shimogō Middle School
Shimogō City Narahara Elementary School
Shimogō City Asahida Elementary School
Shimogō City Egawa Elementary School

Transportation

Railway
 Aizu Railway – Aizu Line
  -  -  -  -  -  -

Highway

Local attractions
Tō-no-Hetsuri rock formations, a National Natural Monument
Ōuchi-juku, an Important Preservation District for Groups of Traditional Buildings
Shimotsuke Kaidō, a National Historic Site
Yunokami Onsen

References

External links

Official Website 

 
Towns in Fukushima Prefecture